The 2019 season was St. Patrick's Athletic F.C.'s 90th year in existence and was the Supersaint's 68th consecutive season in the top-flight of Irish football. It was the first season Harry Kenny took charge of the club, following Liam Buckley's spell in charge for the previous seven seasons. The fixtures were announced on 19 December 2018, with the Saints facing Cork City at home on the opening day of the season for the second year in a row, with the Inchicore side set to play champions Dundalk away from home on the final night of the season. Harry Kenny left his post on the 24th August following a 3–1 loss away to bottom of the table UCD in the FAI Cup. He was replaced by Stephen O'Donnell on the 31st August, his first managerial role. Pats finished 5th in the league and won the Leinster Senior Cup, playing the semi final and final with their underage sides after the league season had ended for the senior team.

Squad

Transfers

Preseason

In

Out

Mid-season

In

Out

Squad statistics

Appearances, goals and cards
Number in brackets represents (appearances of which were substituted ON).
Last updated – 17 November 2019

Top scorers
Includes all competitive matches.
Last updated 17 November 2019

Top assists
Includes all competitive matches.
Last updated 17 November 2019

Top clean sheets
Includes all competitive matches.
Last updated 17 November 2019

Disciplinary record

Captains

Club

Coaching staff
Manager: Stephen O'Donnell
Assistant manager: Pat Cregg
Director of Football: Ger O'Brien
Coach: Martin Doyle
Coach: Seán O'Connor
Goalkeeping coach: Pat Jennings
Strength and Conditioning Coach: Mark Kenneally
Physio: Lee Van Keeftan
Physio: Christy O'Neill
Club Doctor: Dr Matt Corcoran
Equipment Manager: David McGill
Under 19s Manager: Jamie Moore
Under 19s Coach: Simon Madden
Under 19s Coach: Sean Doody
Under 17s Manager: Darragh O'Reilly
Under 17s Assistant Manager: Sean Gahan
Under 15s Manager: Seán O'Connor
Under 15s Coach: Ian Bermingham
Under 13s Manager: Mark Connolly
Under 13s Coach: Brendan Clarke
Under 19s/17s Goalkeeping Coach: Stephen O'Reilly

Kit

|
|
|
|
|}

The club released a new Away kit for the season, with the Home and Third kits being retained from the 2018 season.

Key:
LOI=League of Ireland Premier Division
FAI=FAI Cup
EAC=EA Sports Cup
UEL=UEFA Europa League
LSC=Leinster Senior Cup
FRN=Friendly

Competitions

League of Ireland

League table

Results summary

Results by round

Matches

FAI Cup

EA Sports Cup

Europa League

First qualifying round

Leinster Senior Cup

Friendlies

Preseason

Mid-season

References

2019
2019 League of Ireland Premier Division by club